Ramshaw may refer to:

Places
 Ramshaw, Bishop Auckland, County Durham, England
 Ramshaw, Consett, County Durham, England
 Ramshaw, Minnesota, United States

People
 Darrin Ramshaw (born 1965), Australian cricketer
 Emily Ramshaw (fl. from 2003), American journalist and news executive
 Graham Ramshaw (1945–2006), Australian rules footballer
 John Ramshaw (fl. from 1983), English footballer
 Keira Ramshaw (born 1994), English footballer 
 Terry Ramshaw (1943–2017), English rugby league footballer of the 1960s and 1970s
 Tom Ramshaw (born 1991), Canadian sailor 
 Wendy Ramshaw (1939–2018), British ceramicist, jeweller and sculptor

See also

 Mr Ramshaw, an eagle flown by C. W. R. Knight